Governor's Palace may refer to:

Palace of the Governors, Santa Fe, New Mexico, NRHP-listed
Spanish Governor's Palace, San Antonio, Texas, NRHP-listed
Governor's Palace, New Bern, North Carolina, also known as Tryon Palace
Governor's Palace (Williamsburg, Virginia)
Governor's Palace, Chandigarh, Le Corbusier designed building
Grandmaster's Palace in Valletta, Malta, formerly known as Governor's Palace

See also
Governor's House (disambiguation)
Governor's Mansion (disambiguation)
Old Governor's Mansion (disambiguation)
List of governors' mansions in the United States
Government House